Fauna & Flora International (FFI) is an international conservation charity and non-governmental organization dedicated to protecting the planet's threatened wildlife and habitats. Founded in 1903, it is the world's oldest international conservation organisation. The logo of the society is the Arabian oryx, after the successful Operation Oryx, a flagship captive breeding and reintroduction project undertaken by the society.

Founded as the Society for the Preservation of the Wild Fauna of the Empire, the society created some of the first game reserves and captive breeding programmes during the 20th century. Having since gone through several name and approach changes, FFI today coordinates conservation programmes in around 40 countries, working through local partnerships and with more focus on capacity building, community-based approaches and marine conservation than its previous iterations. The society's peer-reviewed scientific journal, now known as Oryx, has been publishing conservation science articles since 1904.

Fauna & Flora International is constituted under English law as a company limited by guarantee and is a registered charity with its head office in Cambridge. FFI has sister organisations in the U.S. and Australia, and a subsidiary in Singapore. FFI currently runs conservation programs and activities in around 40 countries in collaboration with local partner organisations, institutions, communities and authorities.

FFI has a long history of royal patronage dating back to Edward, Prince of Wales (later Edward VIII), who became the group's patron in 1928. Queen Elizabeth II was FFI's patron for 68 years after her ascension to the throne until this was delegated to Prince William, Duke of Cambridge in October 2020 to align with his "longstanding work around conservation and support for communities protecting their natural environment for future generations." Princess Laurentien of the Netherlands is FFI's current president. FFI also has a number of high-profile vice-presidents, including David Attenborough, who has been involved with FFI since 1959, Stephen Fry, Charlotte Uhlenbroek, and Lord Browne of Madingley.

History
The Society for the Preservation of the Wild Fauna of the Empire was founded as a private organization in 1903 as by a group made up of members of the British aristocracy and American statesmen in colonies in Africa. A central founding figure was Edward Buxton, who had previously sought to protect areas of the UK. The goal of the society was to safeguard the future of southern Africa's large mammal populations, which had declined due to over-hunting and habitat encroachment, within game reserves. From 1903 to 1914, the society lobbied the British colonial government to protect areas of natural resources, control the ivory trade and change the policy of exterminating wildlife to control tsetse flies. The Society played a major part in legislation which controlled hunting and preserved habitat in East Africa and South Africa, paving the way for the formation of some of the first National Parks and influencing the future of nature conservation. Modern scholars have characterised these early efforts as extensions of colonialism. Kruger National Park in South Africa, Serengeti National Park in Tanzania, and several game reserves in Kenya, among others, were first established through the work of the Society.

The society also pioneered the practice of captive breeding and species reintroduction. In response to the extinction of the Arabian oryx, Operation Oryx in collaboration with Phoenix Zoo during the 1960s and with follow-up during subsequent decades successfully re-established wild populations in Oman, Jordan and Saudi Arabia. The practice of captive breeding and release first pioneered during Operation Oryx are now widely used in conservation initiatives.

The society was renamed the Fauna Preservation Society before being renamed Fauna and Flora Preservation Society in 1981 and finally to Fauna and Flora International in 1995.

Modern activities
In addition to global headquarters in the David Attenborough Building in Cambridge, FFI coordinates conservation programmes in countries across the Caribbean, Central America, Africa, Eurasia and the Asia-Pacific.

The society's scientific journal – Oryx – The International Journal of Conservation – is published on its behalf by Cambridge University Press. Since 2008, FFI has also published the Cambodian Journal of Natural History, the first peer-reviewed journal in Cambodia, in partnership with the Royal University of Phnom Penh.

FFI established the Mountain Gorilla Project in Rwanda in 1979 at the request of David Attenborough following the broadcast of Life on Earth. It is now known as the International Gorilla Conservation Programme and is run jointly with the World Wide Fund for Nature.

In Portugal, FFI works with Liga para a Proteção da Natureza on the reintroduction of the Iberian lynx.

In 2004, FFI facilitated the purchase of a former colonial cattle ranch in Kenya and conversion into Ol Pejeta Conservancy, a wildlife sanctuary for black rhinoceros and other rare megafauna. FFI also works to reduce human–elephant conflict through working with farmers.

In 2000, an FFI-led expedition in the Cardamom Mountains in Cambodia led to the rediscovery of the critically endangered Siamese crocodile in the wild, previously thought extinct. Since then, FFI established and continues to run a captive breeding and release program at Phnom Tamao Wildlife Rescue Centre that has increased the wild population. In 2009, FFI, Cambodian authorities and Wildlife Alliance coordinated a crackdown on illegal sassafras oil production, a prerequisite for recreational drug MDMA, in Phnom Samkos Wildlife Sanctuary in response to its role in deforestation and the harvesting of the critically endangered Cinnamomum parthenoxylon. This operation is thought to have significantly disrupted the ecstasy market worldwide. FFI also coordinates a master's degree in biodiversity conservation in partnership with the Royal University of Phnom Penh. Cambodia designated its first marine protected area around Koh Rong in 2016 following several years of collaboration with FFI and other partners.

In the Carpathian Mountains of Romania, FFI works to reduce poaching of bears and wolves by reducing conflict between farmers and wildlife.

FFI began work in Myanmar in 2008. In 2010, a research team including FFI described the Myanmar snub-nosed monkey, a new species. FFI also conducts sea turtle conservation. In 2018, The Guardian published an article claiming that FFI was embroiled in a row with ethnic Karen people in Myanmar and indigenous rights groups over plans to protect up to 800,000 acres of pristine forest from poachers, loggers and palm oil companies. The initiative was seen as potentially displacing villages from ancestral lands without free, prior and informed consent, and having the potential to jeopardise a ceasefire agreement between the Myanmar government and the Karen National Union, which could lead to further conflict in the area. FFI responded by asserting that indigenous people are "at the heart" of their work and that any protected area boundaries will not be decided without free, prior and informed consent. In 2020, FFI were involved in the description of another new primate species, Trachypithecus popa, from Myanmar. There are thought to be around 200 individuals remaining in the wild.

FFI was one of the organisations that successfully campaigned for the banning of microbeads in cosmetic products in the UK in 2019 over concerns that it contributes to marine plastic pollution.

In 2020, FFI called on governments worldwide to adopt a moratorium on all deep sea mining, citing its impact on marine life and launched a campaign calling for $500 billion per year to be invested to protecting wildlife. Both campaigns were supported by David Attenborough and the latter was supported by over 130 other organisations.

Significant landmarks
1904 – First publication of the society's journal, the precursor of Oryx - The International Journal of Conservation
1926 – Kruger National Park is established by the Society for the Preservation of the Wild Fauna of the Empire.
1959 – FFI launches Operation Noah, a large scale wildlife relocation operation in response to the construction of the Kariba Dam and creation of Lake Kariba.
1962 – Operation Oryx helps rescue the Arabian oryx from extinction through a captive breeding program, with successful reintroductions into the wild in Jordan, Oman and Saudi Arabia. This was one of the world's first successful captive breeding and reintroduction efforts for an endangered species.
1966 – Peter Scott, chairman of IUCN Species Survival Commission, becomes chairman of FFI and devises the Red Data Books, a systematic study of all endangered species.
1971 – Launch of the 100% Fund (now the Flagship Species Fund), set up to support small-scale projects where urgent conservation action is needed to protect endangered species around the world.
1972 – Gerald Durrell's initiative caused the society to start the World Conference on Breeding Endangered Species in Captivity as an Aid to their Survival at Jersey, the first knowledge sharing among scientists regarding ideas of captive breeding.
2000 – Alexander Peal, president of the Society for the Conservation of Nature of Liberia, whose work FFI has supported since 1996, receives the Goldman Environmental Prize, one of the highest honours for a conservationist.
2009 – FFI and local partners discover the Myanmar snub-nosed monkey.
 2016 – Cambodia declares its first marine protected area following several years of collaboration by FFI
 2019 – The United Kingdom bans plastic microbeads from cosmetic products following campaigning by FFI and other environmental organisations.

See also 

 Arabian oryx reintroduction
 International Gorilla Conservation Programme
 Oryx (journal)
 Ol Pejeta Conservancy
 Siamese crocodile

References

External links
 

Environmental charities based in the United Kingdom
International environmental organizations
International organisations based in the United Kingdom
Organisations based in Cambridge
Organizations established in 1903
Science and technology in Cambridgeshire
Wildlife conservation organizations
Marine conservation organizations
Animal conservation organizations
International nongovernmental organizations
Charities based in England